The Elk River is a tributary of the Verdigris River in southeastern Kansas in the United States.  Via the Verdigris and Arkansas rivers, it is part of the Mississippi River watershed.

Description and course
The Elk River is formed by a collection of intermittent streams in southwestern Greenwood County, and flows for about  generally east-southeast through Butler, Elk, and Montgomery counties, past the towns of Elk Falls, Longton and Elk City.  It joins the Verdigris River at the northern edge of the city of Independence.

Between Elk City and Independence, a U.S. Army Corps of Engineers dam causes the river to form Elk City Lake.  A state park and federal lands along the lake offer recreation, including three National Recreation Trails.

The Elk River Archeological District is a  area in Elk and Montgomery counties, presumably in the Elk River watershed, which has been listed on the National Register of Historic Places since 1978.

Stream course

See also
List of Kansas rivers

References

External links

Rivers of Kansas
Rivers of Elk County, Kansas
Rivers of Montgomery County, Kansas
Rivers of Butler County, Kansas
Rivers of Greenwood County, Kansas